City of Angels is the seventh studio album by Australian singer-songwriter Vanessa Amorosi. It was released through her own label Scream Louder on 18 March 2022. The album peaked at number 7 on the ARIA Charts, becoming Amorosi's fourth top-ten album and first since Hazardous in 2009. At the 2022 ARIA Music Awards, the album was nominated for Best Soul/R&B Release.

Background
City of Angels is Vanessa's first self-produced album. In speaking with Sydney Sentinel, Amorosi said she considers it the "most Vanessa Amorosi album", saying: "This is going to make people understand who I am." On TV program Sunrise, Amorosi added, "This is the album that I've always wanted to get to people, so it's an exciting time,” and one she describes as 'one hundred percent me." Amorsi said she hopes her fans "feel something" and "go through a journey" when they listen to her latest material.

Reception
Danny Waterson from The Sydney Sentinel called the album "a sonically daring song cycle featuring lush production, exquisite musicianship and some of Amorosi's most personal lyrics to date, it's led by gospel-rock and features myriad musical styles, including Middle Eastern instrumentals." Waterson said "one of the standout tracks is the '80s rock-tinged synth anthem 'Muhammad'" and highlighting "the feel[-]good sing-along song 'Take it Easy'".

Track listing

Charts

Release history

References

2022 albums
Vanessa Amorosi albums
Self-released albums